Ruth Horam (Hebrew: רות הורם; born 1931 – 2 August 2021) was an Israeli painter and sculptor.

Biography
Ruth Horam was born in Tel Aviv, Mandatory Palestine. She was a graduate of the Rehavia Gymnasium in Jerusalem and of Saint Martin's School of Art in London. In 1960, she won the UNESCO Prize for Painting, in Paris. She was married to Yehuda Horam, who served as Israeli ambassador to Switzerland. Between 1964-67, she chaired the Jerusalem Association of Painters and Sculptors. In 1969 she travelled to Seoul, South Korea where she studied the art of calligraphy, returning to Israel in 1973. In 1983, she was Guest-Artist at 'Arabia' Ceramics in Finland. In 1996 she received the MASTO Foundation grant for Creativity. Horam was a resident of Jerusalem until her death in 2021.

Art career 

Since 1993, Horam had worked at the Jerusalem Printing Workshop. Her monotype prints are developed from multi-layered freely printed meshes. In the process she interposes various materials such as paper cuttings, leaves, twigs, scraps of fabric, nature or urban landscape photos. Her works are conceived and done in groups following a theme, each print being a unique creation. Horam had produced environmental sculptures in Jerusalem and other parts of the country. Some of her work is carried out in collaboration with sculptress Magdalena Hefetz. Horam's focal point was ecology and recycling, using such materials as old car parts.

See also
Visual arts in Israel

References

External links 
Horam Art and More - The official Ruth Horam website

1931 births
2021 deaths
People from Tel Aviv
Israeli painters
Israeli women painters
Israeli women sculptors
Israeli sculptors
Alumni of Saint Martin's School of Art
Date of birth unknown